"Holiday Rap" is a song by Dutch musical duo MC Miker G & DJ Sven. The debut single of the duo, it was released in most European countries in 1986 and achieved success, topping the charts of the Netherlands, Belgium, France, Italy, Switzerland, and West Germany and reaching number one on the European Hot 100 Singles chart. In North America, the single did not chart in the United States but peaked at number nine in Canada.

Music and lyrics
Musically, the song is based on Madonna's 1983 hit "Holiday". DJ Martin van der Schagt had a home studio where he recorded the demo version of "Holiday Rap" using the original tape loops of Madonna's "Holiday". Not possible for a commercial release, producer Ben Liebrand figured out which instruments were used in the original and re-recorded the music from scratch as opposed to sampling the original, with different lyrics and new melodies. In the lyrics, both singers tell of their summer vacations in various towns, such as London and New York. The song also features an interpolation of the chorus of Cliff Richard's "Summer Holiday".  The music video for the song was named by MuchMusic as the worst video of 1986.

In 1987, Russian Sergey Minaev, a Soviet DJ and pop singer of the mid-1980s, who specialized in humorous songs and musical parodies, performed his version called "DJ's Rap (Рэп дискжокея)" with new lyrics about Soviet censorship in satirical key. It gained strong popularity throughout the USSR in 1989, when music video was released.

Track listings

Charts

Weekly charts
"Holiday Rap"

"Holiday Rap '91"

Year-end charts

Certifications

See also
 Little Superstar
 David S. Pumpkins

References

External links
 

1986 debut singles
Cultural depictions of Madonna
Dutch Top 40 number-one singles
European Hot 100 Singles number-one singles
Holiday songs
Male vocal duets
MC Miker G & DJ Sven songs
Number-one singles in Belgium
Number-one singles in Germany
Number-one singles in Italy
Number-one singles in Switzerland
SNEP Top Singles number-one singles